The Cherokee Trail was a historic overland trail through the present-day U.S. states of Oklahoma, Kansas, Colorado, and Wyoming that was used from the late 1840s up through the early 1890s. The route was established in 1849 by a wagon train headed to the gold fields in California. Among the members of the expedition were a group of Cherokee. When the train formed in Indian Territory, Lewis Evans of Evansville, Arkansas, was elected Captain. Thus, this expedition is sometimes written as the Evans/Cherokee Train. In 1850 four wagon trains turned west on the Laramie Plains, along Wyoming's southern border to Fort Bridger.

According to one source, "Neither the number of wagons nor the number of people that eventually used this road to cross the Sierra Madres makes this trail significant.  What makes this road unique is that Native Americans and their traveling companions did not just cross the Continental Divide; they made a path over the mountains and through the Wyoming Basin." 

The trail was also known as the Trappers' Trail, but the Trapper's Trail from 1820 in Colorado often varied from Cherokee Trail and took a different route in Wyoming. It also went to Taos, New Mexico.

Route Description

The route originated in Grand River near present-day Salina, Oklahoma.

According to Erb, Brown, and Hughes, "The Cherokee Trail came west out of Oklahoma along the Arkansas River Valley in Colorado to the mouth of Black Squirrel Creek, a tributary of Cherry Creek (Colorado), following the latter to the South Platte River. It went on north along the eastern base of the Rockies to the Cache la Poudre in the vicinity of Laporte and Virginia Dale then over to the Laramie Plains."  The name of the trail originated from the 1849 trek to California of 130 Cherokees, with their 40 wagons, led by Captain Lewis Evans.  

In 1850 four Cherokee/white wagon train crossed the South Platte River near present Denver, turned north pioneering a new wagon road to the Laramie Plains (US Hwy 270) . Then west along the present Wyoming/Colorado border to Green River then NW to Fort Bridger. This route sometimes referred to as the "disease free" or "middle" route increased each year in numbers of Emigrants and cattle drives until by 1857 becoming the most heavily traveled or the major trail to California. In 1857 a new cutoff of the Cherokee Trail was established when the US Army built a road over Bridger Pass to Fort Bridger. By 1862  the Bridger Pass route of the Cherokee Trail was a well wore road when the Overland Mail and Stage moved from South Pass route on to it. In 1869 the rail road reached Utah ending the Overland Mail. The Cherokee Trail continued as an emigrant route as late as 1883 when the last wagon train from Wise County, Texas to Oregon was documented.

In 1854, an additional route was blazed on the west side of the South Platte River, crossing the Cache la Poudre River, and then to the Laramie Plains.  There the trail turned west near present-day Tie Siding, and proceeded along the Colorado/Wyoming border to Green River and to Fort Bridger where it struck the other emigrant trails.

Parts of the 1854 trail can be seen on Bureau of Land Management (BLM) land in Wyoming, California.  In Sweetwater County the trail on BLM sections is marked with  concrete posts.

History
Parts of this trail had been traveled and reported earlier in the 19th Century. According to Gardner, General William Ashley had used part of this route as early as 1824. Gardner also mentions that emigrants heading for Oregon wrote about the routes in and out of Browns Park in 1839.   By 1849, three routes suitable for crossing the Continental Divide had been identified: Twin Groves, Wyoming, an unnamed location near present-day Rawlings, Wyoming and Bridger's Pass. The Cherokee Trail followed the Twin Groves route. 

In 1849, Lieutenant Abraham Buford, escorting the mail from Santa Fe to the east, turned south at McPherson, Kansas, to follow the recently blazed Evans/Cherokee Trail with Captain Lewis Evans and Lieutenant Captain Peter Mankins, with 2nd Lieutenant George Van Hoose leading the expedition Fort Gibson, Oklahoma, and then connected with another trail to nearby Fort Smith, Arkansas.  Starting in 1850 the trail was used continuously by gold seekers, emigrants and cattle drovers from Arkansas, Texas, Missouri, and the Cherokee Nation.

In 1850, a member of a wagon train en route to California discovered gold in Ralston Creek, a tributary of Clear Creek north of present-day Denver.  Stories of this discovery led to further expeditions in 1858, and the subsequent 1859 Colorado Gold Rush.

In the 1860s portions of the trail from northern Colorado to Fort Bridger in Wyoming were incorporated as part of the Overland Trail and stage route between Kansas and Salt Lake City, Utah.

The outlaw L. H. Musgrove traveled on the Cherokee Trail from Colorado into Wyoming during the 1860s. A native of Mississippi, he came to California at the time of the Gold Rush. Apparently deciding that crime was more profitable than panning for gold, he was arrested and charged with murder in Fort Halleck, Wyoming, during 1863. Taken to Denver for trial, he was released on an unexplained technicality, and returned to a life of crime. Musgrove assembled a network of horse thieves known as the Musgrove Gang, who raided government posts and wagon trains along the Colorado Front Range, following the Cherokee Trail. Musgrove was finally captured and taken to jail in Denver. He started a rumor from his cell that friends were planning to help him escape, and that the citizens could not prevent this. Instead, a group of vigilantes demanded that the guards release Musgrove to them. The guards offered no resistance, so the vigilantes took possession of the prisoner. Quickly they moved him to the Larimer Street bridge and ended his criminal career by hanging him beneath the bridge on November 23, 1868.

Notes

References

Sources
Fletcher, Patricia K. A., Jack E. Fletcher, Lee Whiteley, "Cherokee Trail Diaries New Routes to the California Gold Rush Vol 1 1849, Vol II 1850." Sequim, WA Fletcher Family Trust, 1999.
Fletcher, Dr. Jack E., Patricia K.A. Fletcher, "Cherokee Trail Diaries Emigrants, Goldseekers, Cattle Drives and Outlaws 1851-1900, Vol III" Sequim, WA Fletcher Family Trust, 2001.
Marcy, Randolph B., Capt. US Army. The Prairie Traveler. New York: Harper & Brothers, 1859. (retrieved from The Kansas Collection August 18, 2006).
Dictionary of American History by James Truslow Adams, New York: Charles Scribner's Sons, 1940
Whiteley, Lee. The Cherokee Trail: Bent's Old Fort to Fort Bridger
Gehling, Richard. "Colorado's Cherokee Trail'.

External links
 "Wyoming History: The Cherokee Trail - Part I." Western Wyoming Community College.
 "Wyoming History: The Cherokee Trail - Part 2." Western Wyoming Community College.
 "Wyoming History: The Cherokee Trail - Part 3" Western Wyoming Community College.
 "Wyoming History: The Cherokee Trail - Part 4" Western Wyoming Community College.
 "Wyoming History: The Cherokee Trail - Part 5" Western Wyoming Community College.

Cherokee Nation (1794–1907)
Native American trails in the United States
Trails and roads in the American Old West
Historic trails and roads in Colorado
Historic trails and roads in Kansas
Historic trails and roads in Oklahoma
Historic trails and roads in Wyoming
Native American history of Kansas
Native American history of Oklahoma
Native American history of Wyoming
Native American history of Colorado